The SpudFest Family Film and Music Festival was an annual film festival which was established in Driggs, Idaho, U.S.A. in the summer of 2004 by Dawn Wells, the original Mary Ann from Gilligan's Island. It was founded  as a natural outgrowth of the Idaho Film and Television Institute and Film Actors Boot Camp.

SpudFest is a "home to independent features, documentaries and short films by up-and-coming filmmakers making family films." Spud Drive-In Theater in Driggs, Idaho was the homebase for the film screenings, music performances and parties while and other screenings were held at Pierre's Playhouse in Victor, Centre Twin in Idaho Falls and Pond Student's Union at Idaho State University, Pocatello. 

Actors Steve Martin and Danny Glover were both on the board of directors for SpudFest along with film producer Ted Weiant.

A number of films made film premieres at SpudFest including the LDS boy band mockumentary "Sons of Provo" featuring actor Will Swenson and "The Easter Egg Escapade" (later titled "The Easter Egg Adventure") written by children's author John Michael Williams and featuring actors Brooke Shields, Nancy Kerrigan, Joe Pantoliano and the music of Natalie Cole.

Musicians including artists American Idol Finalist Jon Peter Lewis, Lauren Adams and Michael O'Neil performed for the music portion of the festivals. 

In addition to festival founder actress Dawn Wells appearing ever year, other celebrities would often appear like Barbara Eden from "I Dream of Jeannie" and Lou Ferrigno of "The Incredible Hulk."

Idaho Potato Commission was a major sponsor of SpudFest. 

At SpudFest 2007, Dawn Wells presented Idaho Governor Butch Otter with the Idaho Visionary Award.

SpudFest was discontinued in 2008.

External links 

  (parked domain)

References 
 Local News 8 – Spud Fest To Host Free Family Movies. Updated: 7:12 PM, Apr. 5, 2007
 Variety, Thurs., Oct. 7, 2004, 8:22pm PT – Doc unearths 'Past' of pioneer massacre – Pic won Utah's best of state 2004 award Film was scheduled as part of SpudFest, but withdrawn by festival management.
 Deseret News, Aug 1, 2004, 1:00am GMT-6' Spudfest features family films by Lindsie Taylor
 https://www.progressivegrocer.com/former-tv-icons-will-join-idaho-potato-commission-fresh-summit, Progressive Grocer, October 10, 2006]
 

Film festivals in Idaho
Music festivals in Idaho
Defunct film festivals in the United States